Grant Hill is an urban neighborhood in central San Diego, California bordered by Golden Hill to the north, Stockton to the east, Sherman Heights to the west, and Logan Heights to the south.  30th Street connects Grant Hill to the neighborhood of Golden Hill.  Grant Hill is part of the Southeastern Planning Area.

References 
 

Neighborhoods in San Diego
Historic districts in San Diego